Mohamad Aidil Zafuan bin Abd. Radzak (born 3 August 1987) is a Malaysian professional footballer who plays as a defender for Malaysia Super League club Johor Darul Ta'zim and the Malaysia national team.

He is a former member of Malaysia U-23 and Malaysia U-20 squad. He is the older of his twin, Zaquan Adha who also a footballer.

Club career

Negeri Sembilan
Aidil Zafuan began his career with Negeri Sembilan youth team. He represented his hometown, Negeri Sembilan at 2004 Sukma Games. He won the gold medal during the tournament that took place at the Tuanku Abdul Rahman Stadium, Seremban. In 2005-06 season, he was promoted to the first team. In his season debut, Negeri Sembilan won their first Malaysia Super League title.

Malaysian Armed Forces
Aidil signed a contract with Malaysia Premier League side Malaysian Armed Forces for the 2012 Malaysia Premier League season. He won the Malaysia Premier League title in 2012 and reached the 2012 Malaysia Cup final.

Johor Darul Ta'zim 
In 2013 season, Aidil joined the rebranded club Johor Darul Ta'zim (JDT) along with his twin brother, Zaquan Adha. With JDT he won the Malaysia Super League, Malaysia FA Cup, Malaysia Cup and historically part of JDT's 2015 AFC Cup winning team.

International career

Youth
Aidil has represented Malaysia since he was 14 years old. He is very experienced in international youth arena. He played for the Malaysia U-20 side on two AFC Youth Championship in 2004 in Malaysia as Malaysia reached the quarter finals but was defeated by China. At the AFC Youth Championship in India, he was chosen as the captain of the team. Malaysia failed to win all three matches and only managed to score 1 goal and conceding 7 goals.

Under-23
Aidil started representing the Malaysia U-23 squad during 2008 Olympic Games qualifier. He continued to represent Malaysia in the 2007 Merdeka Tournament that held in Shah Alam and Petaling Jaya and managed to win the Merdeka Tournament after defeating Myanmar 3:1. He then represented Malaysia in the South East Asia Games held in  Thailand. However, Malaysia failed to advance into the semi finals after drawing against rivals Singapore. In 2009, he was selected as the captain for the national under 23 team at the 2009 Southeast Asian Games where Malaysia won their first gold medal after 20 years. In 2014, he was selected as one of the overage players for the 2014 Asian Games.

Senior
Aidil made his debut on 18 July 2007 against Cambodia. He also scored his first international goal in his debut against Cambodia. He then became one of the players from the under-23 side who were selected into Malaysia 2007 AFC Asian Cup squad. He only made his appearance in the last game against Iran where Malaysia lost 0–2.

Aidil received his first red card in international duty during the World Cup qualifier second leg against Bahrain. As a result, he was banned by FIFA from taking part in international match for three games.

He also represented the Malaysia XI (represent Malaysia for B match) squad against Chelsea F.C. at Shah Alam Stadium on 29 July 2008. The Malaysia XI eventually lost 0–2. However, Chelsea coach Luiz Felipe Scolari praise the Malaysia XI for giving a good fight against his team.

On July 12, 2016, Aidil with 71 international caps announced his retirement from international football via his football club's website and its Facebook page. He return in 2017 and was part of Malaysia's 2018 AFF Suzuki Cup squad earning 82 international caps during the tournament. In 2019, he earned his 83rd international caps against Sri Lanka.

He earn his 100 appearances for Malaysia in 2020 AFF Championship against Vietnam. During his international career, Aidil went on to play a total of 101 matches for Malaysia and his international appearances comprise 98 'A' international matches as classified by FIFA including 3 international matches not classified as 'A'.

Career statistics

Club

International

International goals

Honours

Club
Negeri Sembilan
 Sukma Games  Gold Medal: 2004
 Malaysia Super League: 2005−06
 Malaysia Cup: 2009, 2011
 Malaysia FA Cup: 2010

Malaysian Armed Forces
 Malaysia Premier League: 2012

Johor Darul Ta'zim
 AFC Cup: 2015
 Malaysian Charity Shield: 2015, 2016, 2018, 2019, 2020, 2021, 2022, 2023
 Malaysia Super League: 2014, 2015, 2016, 2017, 2018, 2019, 2020, 2021, 2022
 Malaysia FA Cup: 2016, 2022
 Malaysia Cup: 2017, 2019, 2022

International
Malaysia U-23
 Pestabola Merdeka: 2007
 Southeast Asian Games: 2009

Malaysia
 AFF Championship runner-up: 2018

Individual
 FAM Football Awards : 2012 Anugerah Bola Sepak Kebangsaan 100Plus-FAM : Favourite Defender – ATM FA
 FAM Football Awards : 2010 Anugerah Bola Sepak Kebangsaan 100Plus-FAM : Favourite Defender – Negeri Sembilan
 FAM Football Awards : 2009 Anugerah Bola Sepak Kebangsaan 100Plus-FAM : Favourite Defender – Negeri Sembilan
 AFC Cup All-Time XI : 2021

References

External links
 
 

1987 births
Living people
Identical twins
People from Negeri Sembilan
Malaysian twins
Malaysian footballers
Malaysian people of Minangkabau descent
Malaysian people of Indonesian descent
Malaysian people of Malay descent
Malaysia international footballers
2007 AFC Asian Cup players
Negeri Sembilan FA players
ATM FA players
Johor Darul Ta'zim F.C. players
Malaysia Super League players
Association football central defenders
Footballers at the 2014 Asian Games
Southeast Asian Games gold medalists for Malaysia
Southeast Asian Games medalists in football
Competitors at the 2009 Southeast Asian Games
Asian Games competitors for Malaysia
AFC Cup winning players